2 Champions of Shaolin (少林與武當 Shàolín Yǔ Wǔdāng) is a 1980 Shaw Brothers film directed by Chang Cheh. Starring the Venoms, it continues the then-popular theme of feuds between Shaolin and Wu tang. The film was digitally manipulated by Joseph Kahn for the Chemical Brothers' music video "Get Yourself High".

Plot 
Two young warriors from the Ming loyalist Shaolin Clan are engaged in a deadly secret mission that could bring down the Qing empire. Tung Chien-chen is the "Shaolin Hercules", who is sent from Shaolin to take revenge on the local Wudang experts. Li Detong and Li Pashan are the Wudang chiefs who attempt to kill Tung using Li Detong's throwing knives technique after meeting him in a restaurant. Tung barely escapes and meets up with Chin Tailei and his sister, who teach him a special kung fu to counter knives. He eventually meets up with Hu Wei-chen, who is another Shaolin student. Wei Sing-hung is the son of a Ming general who was adopted by Wudang, but in his heart he supports Shaolin and frequently questions why the Wudang sect supports the Qing but is usually hushed quickly by his masters. His love interest is Wang Li's daughter, Li Erh-wan.

The Wudang teacher, Feng Daode, sends Detong to kill Tung. However, Tung, Tailei, and Wei-chen end up killing him, forcing Wudang to take revenge. Li Pashan and another Wudang disciple, Lu Yingbu, challenge Tung and Hu to a duel, but Tung bests Pashan and Hu kills Yingbu. Tung plans to marry Chin Tailei's sister, but after getting drunk and the wedding raided by the Wudang, Chin and his sister are killed, Tung is kidnapped, and Wei-chen is too inebriated to help defend. Wei Sing secretly meets up with Wei-chen, then frees Tung and allows him to escape, but is found out by Li Erh-wan when he unknowingly leaves his dagger behind, forcing a rift between them. Tung, realizing his wife is dead, loses his will to fight until his brothers bring him back to reality. Tung and the other Shaolin men visit his wife's grave and meet up with a wandering scholar, Kow Xuewen, and his three servants. They immediately befriend Tung and Wei-chen. Kow occasionally brings them food and gifts and discusses martial arts with them. Kow Xuewen is secretly a Qing government official, Kow Chinchong, who uses the monkey sword style while his servants use the monkey poles. They are planning to ambush the Shaolin men.

Wei Sing finds out about the plan, and sides with Tung and Hu Wei-chen. All the men end up in a battle at a local tea house. Tung and Wei-chen kill Kow Chinchong and his servants (being killed themselves in the process) and Wei Sing kills Li Pashan. Erh-wan arrives just as Wei kills her uncle. She tearfully asks him why he would betray his own adoptive family. In response, a speechless Wei kills himself.

Cast
Feng Lu as Kow Xuewen/Kow Ching-chung
Lo Meng as Tung Chien-chen
Chiang Sheng as Hu Wei-chen
Chin Siu-Ho as Wei Sing-hung
Wang Li as Li Pashan
Yu Tai-Ping as Li Detong
Sun Chien as Chin Tailei
Wen Hsueh Erh as Li Erh-wan

External links 
 
Two Champions of Shaolin at Hong Kong Cinemagic

1980 films
Kung fu films
Shaw Brothers Studio films
Shaolin Temple in film
Films directed by Chang Cheh
1980 martial arts films
Hong Kong martial arts films
1980s Hong Kong films